The Anglican Church of St Nicholas in Dinnington, Somerset, England was built in the 15th century. It is a Grade II* listed building.

History

A church was established in the village by 1207. The current building is mostly from the 15th century with restoration in 1863, which include the removal of a gallery.

It was originally a chapelry to Seavington St Mary.

The parish is part of the benefice of Merriott with Hinton, Dinnington and Lopen within the Diocese of Bath and Wells.

Architecture

The hamstone building has slate roofs with a small bell turret. It has a two-bay chancel and three-bay nave.

The interiors fittings are mostly 19th century but there is a 13th-century recut decorated stone font.

See also
 List of ecclesiastical parishes in the Diocese of Bath and Wells

References

Grade II* listed buildings in South Somerset
Grade II* listed churches in Somerset
Church of England church buildings in South Somerset